was an Imperial Japanese Army officer who was a central conspirator in the 26 February Incident in 1936. His final rank was Captain.

Career 
Nonaka was born in the city of Okayama, in a family of career military officers. He enrolled in Tokyo Fourth Junior High School (now Toyama High School in the Shinjuku City), and graduated in the 36th class of the  Imperial Japanese Army Academy in 1924.  Later, he became an Infantry Captain in 1933. During the February 26 Incident, he led 500 soldiers to take over Tokyo Metropolitan Police Department headquarters, but committed suicide on 29 February when the coup d'état failed.

Portrayals

Film 
Eiichi Sugasawara (『叛乱]』, 1954, Shin Saburi)
Asao Matsumoto (『重臣と青年将校 陸海軍流血史』, 1958, Michiyoshi Doi)
Fumitake Omura (『銃殺　２・２６の叛乱』, 1964, Tsuneo Kobayashi) (as "Captain Noda")
Kenichi Hagiwara  (『226』, 1989, Hideo Gosha)

Theatre 
Masaru Yamamoto (『狂騒昭和維新』, 1975)
Ryuichi Onodera (『恋が散る、雪が舞う』, 2005)

See also 
Showa Restoration

Notes 

People from Okayama Prefecture
1903 births
1936 suicides
Imperial Japanese Army officers
Suicides in Japan
Japanese military personnel who committed suicide
1936 deaths
Imperial Japanese Army Academy alumni